Ephippiger ephippiger, the saddle-backed bush cricket, is a species belonging to the family Tettigoniidae  subfamily Bradyporinae. It is found in all of  Europe except the British Isles. but it is only common in Southwest Europe.
The habitat consists of relatively dry and sparse areas with scarce vegetation, such as heather with a few trees, where it can be found both close to the soil and higher up in the vegetation. The saddle-backed bush cricket mainly eats insects and other small animals, but also plant parts. For arable farmers, it is a useful animal because it lives in plants but mainly hunts for plant-dwelling (pest) insects. It is active during the months of August to October; the males are mainly heard between eleven o'clock in the morning and nine o'clock in the evening. The sound is clearly audible and consists of a sharp, grating squeak that sounds like tieh, but is repeated in long runs with a frequency of about one or two times per second.

References

Orthoptera of Europe
Tettigoniidae
Insects described in 1784